Grand Secret is a suburb in the Charters Towers Region, Queensland, Australia. In the  Grand Secret had a population of 168 people.

Geography
Only the south-eastern strip of the suburb is used for residential purposes with the bulk of the suburb being used for grazing on native vegetation.

History
The suburb is presumably named after the two Grand Secret gold mines which were worked from:
 1882 to 1884
 1895 to 1897
These mines were located in the far south of the suburb.

In 2010 the central suburb of Charters Towers City was created by combining the former suburb of Lissner with land excised from Queenton and Grand Secret.

In the 2011 census, Grand Secret had a population of 145 people.

In the  Grand Secret had a population of 168 people.

Education
There are no schools in Grand Secret. The nearest primary school is Charters Towers Central State School in neighbouring Charters Towers City to the east. The nearest secondary school is Charters Towers State High School, also in Charters Towers City.

References

Suburbs of Charters Towers